Labinsk is a town in Krasnodar Krai, Russia, located on the Bolshaya Laba River (Kuban's tributary)  southeast of Krasnodar and  southwest of Armavir. Population: 57,428 (2021), 59,330 (2020),    53,000 (1972).

History

The stanitsa of Labinskaya was founded in autumn of 1841. It was named after the Bolshaya Laba River on which it stands. Its history is closely connected with the history of the Caucasian War and establishment of a special strategic defense line on the Bolshaya Laba River. The stanitsa was originally one of the fortresses that were founded along the southern border of the Russian Empire neighboring the Caucasus mountains and were protected by the Don Cossacks who eventually became the first settlers of Labinskaya. Later, many peasants belonging to the Cossack social class, both Russians and Ukrainians, moved to Labinskaya from the inner territories of Russia. With a population over 30,000 people, Labinskaya soon became a big trade center among the neighboring stanitsas owing to its favorable location in the river valley.

In 1913, a railway station was built in Labinskaya that integrated it in the railway system of the Russian Empire.

From August 1942 to January 1943, Labinskaya was occupied by the Germans. The residents were resisting the enemy—Labinsk Fighter Squadron was established in the stanitsa with Ivan Konstantinov appointed as the Commander-in-Chief. After the war, one of the central streets was named after him. On January 25, 1943, Labinskaya was liberated from the Nazi occupation.

In the post-war years, Labinskaya was quickly rebuilt and renovated. In 1947, the stanitsa was granted town status and renamed Labinsk.

Administrative and municipal status
Within the framework of administrative divisions, Labinsk serves as the administrative center of Labinsky District, even though it is not a part of it. As an administrative division, together with two rural localities, it is incorporated separately as the Town of Labinsk—an administrative unit with the status equal to that of the districts. As a municipal division, the Town of Labinsk is incorporated within Labinsky Municipal District as Labinskoye Urban Settlement.

Economy
Food processing industry: canning plant, sugar refinery, cheese-making and meat-processing plants
Light industry: sewing and footwear factory
Chemical industry: paint-and-varnish plant

Cereal crops and potatoes are cultivated in the region. Melon-growing is widespread. Dairy cattle and pig breeding are a part of local agriculture.

In 1985-1989, a cheese and whey processing plant was delivered by a Finnish consortium Valio-Hankkija-YIT.

Tourism
There is Laba health resort on the territory of Labinsk town that boasts its healing medicinal waters. The composition of the water in Labinsk is reported to resemble the composition of Baden-Baden mineral waters.

The most popular routes take the tourists along the local sites, waterfalls, caves including the trips to Lago-Naki plateau, Azishsky cave as well as Round and Black Lakes in the village of Gornoye.

References

Notes

Sources

External links
Official website of Krasnodar Krai. Information about Labinsk 
Unofficial website of Labinsk

Cities and towns in Krasnodar Krai